Minsk Ice Palace is an indoor sporting arena located in Minsk, Belarus.  It is used to host various indoor events.  The arena seats 1,823 spectators and opened in 1999.

External links
Venue information

Indoor arenas in Belarus
Ice hockey venues in Belarus